Brunei People's Party (Malay: Parti Rakyat Brunei, PRB) is a banned political party in Brunei. PRB was established as a left leaning party in 1956 and aimed to bring Brunei into full independence from the United Kingdom. The party sought to democratise the government by shifting the national leadership from the palace to the people.

Formation
Brunei People's Party was established, initially, as a branch of the Malayan People's Party (MPP) on 21 January 1956, at the house owned by a prominent leader, H.M. Salleh at Kampong Kianggeh, Brunei Town, two months after MPP was founded in Malaya. About 150 people attended the event. Some of them include Manan bin Muhammad, Muhammad bin Sulaiman, Zaini bin Haji Ahmad, Jais bin Haji Karim, Muhammad Jamaluddin, H.B. Hidup and Jasin bin Affandy. The meeting was chaired by A.M. Azahari, and assisted by H.M. Salleh.

Radical influences from Malaya
In early July 1955, A.M. Azahari had visited the Malay Peninsula and Singapore. While in Singapore, he met with a well-known political figure, Harun Muhammad Amin (Harun Aminurrashid). He was once blacklisted by the British administration in Malaya and Brunei. The meeting had substantially affected his minds and actions.

A.M. Azahari also met several leaders of radical Malays such as Burhanuddin al-Helmy, Ishak Haji Muhammad and Harun Muhammad Amin at the house of Ahmad Boestaman at Kampong Baru, Kuala Lumpur.

Malaysian issue
In 1961, PRB rejected the proposal for membership in federation with Malaysia, proposed by Malaya's Prime Minister, Tunku Abdul Rahman even though the government of Brunei was favourable to the federation. On 12 January 1962, PRB leader A.M. Azahari was appointed to the Brunei Legislative Council and PRB won all 16 of the elected seats in the 33 seat legislature in the August 1962 elections.

The first meeting of the Legislative Council was scheduled on 5 December 1962 and PRB stated that it would submit a resolution for the return of British North Borneo and Sarawak to Brunei to form an independent state known as the North Borneo Federation, the rejection of Brunei's entry into Malaysia and the independence of Brunei in 1963. Sultan Omar Ali Saifuddin III rejected this proposed resolution and postponed the opening of the Legislative Council to 19 December 1962.

PRB's Rebellion
On 8 December 1962 an armed insurrection by the PRB now known as the Brunei Rebellion broke out in Brunei and bordering areas of North Borneo and Sarawak. The rebels were known as the Tentera Nasional Kalimantan Utara (TNKU) or North Kalimantan National Army and a few key towns were occupied by the TNKU. The Brunei police however remained loyal to the Sultan and his government and additional British troops landed from Singapore by the evening of the same day.

By 9 December 1962, the rebellion was effectively broken when Sultan Omar Ali Saifuddin III declared PRB illegal and condemned the TNKU for treason although sporadic incidences continued to occur. The Sultan also publicly stated Brunei's intention not to join the Malaysian federation. The rebellion ended five months later with the capture of Yassin Affandi. PRB leader, A.M. Azahari, who was in Manila during the outbreak of the rebellion, fled into exile in Jakarta.

PRB in exile
On 13 July 1973 PRB detainees who had refused to renounce the party staged an escape and reconstituted the party in exile. In December, an Ad Hoc Committee for the Independence of Brunei was established in Kuala Lumpur. Subsequently, on 7 May 1974, the PRB was formally reactivated with the naming of an executive committee with A.M. Azahari as president.

The PRB continued to garner international moral and material support throughout the 1970s and resulted in the United Nations General Assembly adopting Resolution 3424 that established principles of succession and legitimacy that any government established in Brunei should meet.

Current status of PRB
PRB today is believed to be still operating in exile although it is most likely dormant.

On 12 September 2005, former political prisoner and Secretary General of PRB, Yassin Affandi, co-founded the National Development Party.  is the third political party that is operating legally in Brunei to date.

See also
 Brunei Revolt

References

External links
 (In Malay)
 (In English)

Political parties in Brunei
Banned socialist parties
Political parties established in 1956
1956 establishments in Brunei